Cecil Tristram ("Tris") Bennett (10 August 1902 – 3 February 1978) was an English first-class cricketer active 1922–28 who played for Middlesex, Surrey, Marylebone Cricket Club (MCC) and Cambridge University as a right-handed batsman. Regarded as a "brilliant" slip fielder, Bennett held 43 catches in his 50 first-class matches. He toured the West Indies in 1925–26 with the MCC team. Bennett was born in Tulse Hill, London; died in Islington.

He was educated at Harrow School and Cambridge University both for whom he played cricket, even serving as a captain for the latter.

References

1902 births
1978 deaths
English cricketers
Middlesex cricketers
Surrey cricketers
Marylebone Cricket Club cricketers
Cambridge University cricketers
Free Foresters cricketers
People educated at Harrow School
English cricketers of 1919 to 1945
H. D. G. Leveson Gower's XI cricketers